The Tsay Keh Dene First Nation is one of the Sekani bands of the Northern Interior of British Columbia. Tsay Keh Dene means "People of the Mountain". While they have an office in the City of Prince George, their territories, settlements, and Indian Reserves are all to the north, in the area of Williston Lake, the creation of which flooded a large part of their territory with devastating effects on the people and their way of life.

Indian Reserves and Settlements
Indian Reserves and Settlements under the jurisdiction of the Tsay Keh Dene First Nation are:
Ingenika Settlement
Mesilinka
Parnsip Indian Reserve No. 5, on the left bank of the Parsnip River at Fort Grahame, 34.20 ha.
Police Meadow Indian Reserve No. 2, 4 miles east of the Finlay River, 15 miles northwest of Fort Grahame, 129.50 ha.
Tutu Creek Indian Reserve No. 4, on left bank of the Parnsip River at Fort Grahame, 37.30 ha.

The Tse Keh Nay, formerly known as the Ingenika, live at the north end of the Williston Reservoir in the community of Tsay Keh Dene. They have lived in the "Rocky Mountain Trench for many generations." In 1824 Samuel Black, an early fur trader visited the region and kept a journal of his visit there with Tse Keh Nay Chief Methodiates and his followers. He described the historic use of the resource rich Amazay/Thutade/ Kemess area. Duncan (Amazay) Lake – known as Amazay Lake in Sekani – is a natural -long long wilderness fish-bearing lake with rainbow trout and whitefish populations, located at the headwaters of the Findlay watershed.57.0693921,-126.8010853,2830 

Amazay Lake was the calving ground for caribou in the month of May.

References

External links
Tsay Keh Dene band 
Dəne Yi’injetl - The Scattering of Man - film about the effect of the W. A. C. Bennett Dam on Tsay Keh Dene people

First Nations governments in British Columbia
Northern Interior of British Columbia
Dene governments